Hamsad Rangkuti (7 May 1943 – 26 August 2018) was an Indonesian writer.

In 2007, he won the South East Asian Write Award among Indonesian writers for "Bibir dalam Pispot".

Works
 Bibir dalam Pispot (2003) ; "Lips on the Chamber Pot", translated by Harry Aveling (Angkor Verlag; Kindle E-book 2015)
 Sampah bulan Desember : kumpulan cerpen (2000) 
 Cemara (1982)
 Lukisan perkawinan (1982)
 Ketika lampu berwarna merah (2001) 
 Aisyah di balik tirai jendela (2006) 
 Kalung dari gunung: kumpulan cerpen pengarang-pengarang aksara (2004)

References
"Hamsad Rangkuti Kembali Raih Penghargaan Sastra", Kompas, October 30, 2008
"Hamsad Rangkuti: Long journey of a short-story master", by Ary Hermawan, Jakarta Post, September 27, 2008

1943 births
2018 deaths
Indonesian writers
People from Medan
Mandailing people
Deaths from cerebrovascular disease